HMCS Nootka was a  that served in the Royal Canadian Navy from 1938–1945. She saw service during the Second World War as a local minesweeper working out of Halifax, Nova Scotia. She was named for Nootka Sound. In 1943 she was renamed HMCS Nanoose to allow the unit name Nootka to be used by the destroyer . Following the war the ship was sold for mercantile use, becoming the tugboat Sung Ling. The ship's registry was deleted in 1993.

Design and description 
In 1936, new minesweepers were ordered for the Royal Canadian Navy. Based on the British , those built on the West Coast of Canada would cost $403,000 per vessel. At the outbreak of the Second World War, the Royal Canadian Navy considered constructing more, but chose to build s instead upon learning of that design due to their oil-burning engines.

The Fundy class, named after the lead ship, displaced . They had a complement of 3 officers and 35 ratings.

The Fundy class was propelled by one shaft driven by vertical triple expansion engine powered by steam from a one-cylinder boiler.

The ships were armed with one QF  Mk IV gun mounted forward on a raised platform. The minesweepers were armed with two 20 mm Oerlikon anti-aircraft cannon. They were later equipped with 25 depth charges.

Construction and career
Nootka was ordered on 23 August 1937. The ship's keel was laid down on 1 February 1938 by Yarrows Ltd. at Esquimalt, British Columbia and the vessel was launched on 26 September later that year. The minesweeper was commissioned into the Royal Canadian Navy on 6 December 1938 at Esquimalt.

After commissioning, Nootka was assigned to Esquimalt. When the Second World War commenced, she remained a part of the Esquimalt force, performing local patrol duties. In March 1940, she and her sister, transferred to the East Coast, joining the Halifax Local Defence Force upon arrival. Nootka performed local patrol and minesweeping duties in and around Halifax harbour. The minesweeper spent the rest of the war in this service.

On 1 April 1943, Nootka gave up her name so it could be used by a newly constructed Tribal-class destroyer. The ship was renamed Nanoose but kept her pennant number. Nanoose was paid off on 29 July 1945 at Halifax and laid up. In 1946 the minesweeper was sold to Chinese interests and converted for commercial use. She reappeared as the tugboat Sung Ling. The ship's registry was deleted in 1993.

References

Notes

Citations

Sources

External links

 HMCS Nootka (i) at Readyayeready.com
 

Fundy-class minesweepers
Ships built in British Columbia
1938 ships
World War II minesweepers of Canada